The R520 (codenamed Fudo) is a graphics processing unit (GPU) developed by ATI Technologies and produced by TSMC. It was the first GPU produced using a 90 nm photolithography process.

The R520 is the foundation for a line of DirectX 9.0c and OpenGL 2.0 3D accelerator X1000 video cards. It is ATI's first major architectural overhaul since the R300 and is highly optimized for Shader Model 3.0. The Radeon X1000 series using the core was introduced on October 5, 2005, and competed primarily against Nvidia's GeForce 7000 series. ATI released the successor to the R500 series with the R600 series on May 14, 2007.

ATI does not provide official support for any X1000 series cards for Windows 8 or Windows 10; the last AMD Catalyst for this generation is the 10.2 from 2010 up to Windows 7. AMD stopped providing drivers for Windows 7 for this series in 2015.

A series of open source Radeon drivers are available when using a Linux distribution.

The same GPUs are also found in some AMD FireMV products targeting multi-monitor set-ups.

Delay during the development 
The Radeon X1800 video cards that included an R520 were released with a delay of several months because ATI engineers discovered a bug within the GPU in a very late stage of development. This bug, caused by a faulty 3rd party 90 nm chip design library, greatly hampered clock speed ramping, so they had to "respin" the chip for another revision (a new GDSII had to be sent to TSMC). The problem had been almost random in how it affected the prototype chips, making it difficult to identify.

Architecture
The R520 architecture is referred to by ATI as an "Ultra Threaded Dispatch Processor", which refers to ATI's plan to boost the efficiency of their GPU, instead of going with a brute force increase in the number of processing units. A central pixel shader "dispatch unit" breaks shaders down into threads (batches) of 16 pixels (4×4) and can track and distribute up to 128 threads per pixel "quad" (4 pipelines each). When a shader quad becomes idle due to a completion of a task or waiting for other data, the dispatch engine assigns the quad with another task to do in the meantime. The overall result is theoretically a greater utilization of the shader units. With a large number of threads per quad, ATI created a very large processor register array that is capable of multiple concurrent reads and writes, and has a high-bandwidth connection to each shader array, providing the temporary storage necessary to keep the pipelines fed by having work available as much as possible. With chips such as RV530 and R580, where the number of shader units per pipeline triples, the efficiency of pixel shading drops off slightly because these shaders still have the same level of threading resources as the less endowed RV515 and R520.

The next major change to the core is to its memory bus. R420 and R300 had nearly identical memory controller designs, with the former being a bug fixed release designed for higher clock speeds. R520's memory bus differs with its central controller (arbiter) that connects to the "memory clients". Around the chip are two 256-bit ring buses running at the same speed as the DRAM chips, but in opposite directions to reduce latency. Along these ring buses are four "stop" points where data exits the ring and goes into or out of the memory chips. There is a fifth, significantly less complex stop that is designed for the PCI Express interface and video input. This design allows memory accesses to be quicker though lower latency from the smaller distance the signals need to move through the GPU, and by increasing the number of banks per DRAM. The chip can spread out memory requests faster and more directly to the RAM chips. ATI claimed a 40% improvement in efficiency over older designs. Smaller cores such as RV515 and RV530 received cutbacks due to their smaller, less costly designs. RV530, for example, has two internal 128-bit buses instead. This generation has support for all recent memory types, including GDDR4. In addition to a ring bus, each memory channel has the granularity of 32-bits, which improves memory efficiency when performing small memory requests.

The vertex shader engines were already at the required FP32 precision in ATI's older products. Changes necessary for SM3.0 included longer instruction lengths, dynamic flow control instructions, with branches, loops and subroutines and a larger temporary register space. The pixel shader engines are actually quite similar in computational layout to their R420 counterparts, although they were heavily optimized and tweaked to reach high clock speeds on the 90 nm process. ATI has been working for years on a high-performance shader compiler in their driver for their older hardware, so staying with a similar basic design that is compatible offered obvious cost and time savings.

At the end of the pipeline, the texture addressing processors are decoupled from pixel shaders, so any unused texturing units can be dynamically allocated to pixels that need more texture layers. Other improvements include 4096x4096 texture support and ATI's 3Dc normal map compression saw an improvement in compression ratio for more specific situations.

The R5xx family introduced a more advanced onboard motion-video engine. Like the Radeon cards since the R100, the R5xx can offload almost the entire MPEG-1/2 video pipeline. The R5xx can also assist in Microsoft WMV9/VC-1 and MPEG H.264/AVC decoding, by a combination of the 3D/pipeline's shader-units and the motion-video engine. Benchmarks show only a modest decrease in CPU-utilization for VC-1 and H.264 playback.

A selection of real-time 3D demonstration programs was released at launch. ATI's development of their "digital superstar", Ruby, continued with a new demo named The Assassin. It showcased a highly complex environment, with high-dynamic-range lighting (HDR) and dynamic soft shadows. Ruby's latest competing program, Cyn, was composed of 120,000 polygons.

The cards support dual-link DVI output and HDCP. However, using HDCP requires external ROM to be installed, which were not available for early models of the video cards. RV515, RV530, and RV535 cores include a single and a double DVI link; R520, RV560, RV570, R580, R580+ cores include two double DVI links.

AMD released the final Radeon R5xx Acceleration document.

Drivers
The last AMD Catalyst version that officially supports this series, is 10.2, display driver version 8.702.

Variants

X1300–X1550 series

This series is the budget solution of the X1000 series and is based on the RV515 core. The chips have four texture units, four ROPs, four pixel shaders, and 2 vertex shaders, similar to the older X300 – X600 cards. These chips use one quad of an R520, whereas the faster boards use just more of these quads; for example, the X1800 uses four quads. This modular design allows ATI to build a "top to bottom" line-up using identical technology, saving research, development time, and money. Because of its smaller design, these cards offer lower power demands (30 watts), so they run cooler and can be used in smaller cases. Eventually, ATI created the X1550 and discontinued the X1300. The X1050 was based on the R300 core and was sold as an ultra-low-budget part.

Early Mobility Radeon X1300 to X1450 are based around the RV515 core as well.

Beginning in 2006, Radeon X1300 and X1550 products were shifted to the RV505 core, which had similar capabilities and features as the previous RV515 core, but was manufactured by TSMC using an 80 nm process (reduced from the 90 nm process of the RV515).

X1600 series
X1600 uses the M56 core which is based on the RV530 core, a core similar but distinct from RV515.

The RV530 has a 3:1 ratio of pixel shaders to texture units. It possesses 12 pixel shaders while retaining RV515's four texture units and four ROPs. It also gains three extra vertex shaders, bringing the total to 5 units. The chip's single "quad" has 3 pixel shader processors per pipeline, similar to the design of R580's 4 quads. This means that RV530 has the same texturing ability as the X1300 at the same clock speed, but with its 12 pixel shaders it is on par with the X1800 in shader computational performance. Due to the programming content of available games, the X1600 is greatly hampered by lack of texturing power.

The X1600 was positioned to replace Radeon X600 and Radeon X700 as ATI's mid-range GPU. The Mobility Radeon X1600 and X1700 are also based on the RV530.

X1650 series

The X1650 series has two parts: the X1650 Pro uses the RV535 core (which is a RV530 core manufactured on the newer 80 nm process), and has both a lower power consumption and heat output than the X1600. The other part, the X1650XT, uses the newer RV570 core (also known as the RV560) though it has lower processing power (note that the fully equipped RV570 core powers the X1950Pro, a high-performance card) to match its main competitor, Nvidia's 7600GT.

X1800 series
Originally the flagship of the X1000 series, the X1800 series was released with mild reception due to the rolling release and the gain by its competitor at that time, NVIDIA's GeForce 7 Series. When the X1800 entered the market in late 2005, it was the first high-end video card with a 90 nm GPU. ATI opted to fit the cards with either 256 MB or 512 MB on-board memory (foreseeing a future of ever growing demands on local memory size). The X1800XT PE was exclusively on 512 MB on-board memory. The X1800 replaced the R480-based Radeon X850 as ATI's premier performance GPU.

With R520's delayed release, its competition was far more impressive than if the chip had made its originally scheduled spring/summer release. Like its predecessor, the X850, the R520 chip carries 4 "quads", which means it has similar texturing capability at the same clock speed as its ancestor and the NVIDIA 6800 series. Unlike the X850, the R520's shader units are vastly improved: they are Shader Model 3 capable, and received some advancements in shader threading that can greatly improve the efficiency of the shader units. Unlike the X1900, the X1800 has 16 pixel shader processors and equal ratio of texturing to pixel shading capability. The chip also increases the vertex shader number from six on the X800 to eight. With the 90 nm low-K fabrication process, these high-transistor chips could still be clocked at very high frequencies, which allows the X1800 series to be competitive with GPUs with more pipelines but lower clock speeds, such as the NVIDIA 7800 and 7900 series that use 24 pipelines.

The X1800 was quickly replaced by the X1900 because of its delayed release. The X1900 was not behind schedule, and was always planned as the "spring refresh" chip. However, due to the large quantity of unused X1800 chips, ATI decided to kill one quad of pixel pipelines and sell them off as the X1800GTO.

X1900 and X1950 series

The X1900 and X1950 series fixed several flaws in the X1800 design and added a significant pixel shading performance boost. The R580 core is pin-compatible with the R520 PCBs, which meant a redesign of the X1800 PCB was not needed. The boards carry either 256 MB or 512 MB of onboard GDDR3 memory depending on the variant. The primary change between the R580 and the R520 is that ATI changed the pixel shader processor-to-texture processor ratio. The X1900 cards have three pixel shaders on each pipeline instead of one, giving a total of 48 pixel shader units. ATI took this step with the expectation that future 3D software will be more pixel shader intensive.

In the latter half of 2006, ATI introduced the Radeon X1950 XTX, which is a graphics board using a revised R580 GPU called R580+. R580+ is the same as R580 except it supports GDDR4 memory, a new graphics DRAM technology that offers lower power consumption per clock and offers a significantly higher clock rate ceiling. The X1950 XTX clocks its RAM at 1 GHz (2 GHz DDR), providing 64.0 GB/s of memory bandwidth, a 29% advantage over the X1900 XTX. The card was launched on August 23, 2006.

The X1950 Pro was released on October 17, 2006, and was intended to replace the X1900GT in the competitive sub-$200 market segment. The X1950 Pro GPU is built off of the 80 nm RV570 core with only 12 texture units and 36 pixel shaders, and is the first ATI card that supports native Crossfire implementation by a pair of internal Crossfire connectors, which eliminates the need for the unwieldy external dongle found in older Crossfire systems.

Radeon feature matrix

Chipset table

See also
 List of AMD graphics processing units
 Free and open-source device drivers: graphics#ATI.2FAMD

References

External links
 R500 family ISA documentation
 techPowerUp! GPU Database

ATI Technologies products
Graphics cards
Computer-related introductions in 2005

fr:Radeon R500